Thamyris Glacier is a 3 km long and 2.8 km wide glacier draining the east slopes of the Trojan Range on Anvers Island in the Palmer Archipelago, Antarctica.  Situated east of Iliad Glacier, south of Rhesus Glacier and northwest of Kleptuza Glacier.  Flowing northeastwards into Fournier Bay south of Predel Point and north of Madzharovo Point.

The glacier is named after the Thracian singer Thamyris in Homer's Iliad.

Location
British mapping in 1980.

See also
 List of glaciers in the Antarctic
 Glaciology

Maps
 British Antarctic Territory. Scale 1:200000 topographic map No. 3217. DOS 610 - W 64 62. Tolworth, UK, 1980.
 Antarctic Digital Database (ADD). Scale 1:250000 topographic map of Antarctica. Scientific Committee on Antarctic Research (SCAR). Since 1993, regularly upgraded and updated.

References
 Thamyris Glacier SCAR Composite Gazetteer of Antarctica.
 Bulgarian Antarctic Gazetteer. Antarctic Place-names Commission. (details in Bulgarian, basic data in English)

External links
 Thamyris Glacier. Copernix satellite image

Glaciers of the Palmer Archipelago
Bulgaria and the Antarctic
Geography of Anvers Island